Lady Cops or Les Keufs is a 1987 French comedy film directed by Josiane Balasko.

Plot 
Mireille Molineux, police inspector, stalking pimps. With the complicity of Yasmina, a prostitute, she stops Charlie, her pimp. To avenge Mireille, Jean-Pierre, another pimp, accused of corruption. She then investigated two inspectors IGS: Blondel and Lacroix. Soon after, Charlie is released for lack of evidence. To keep Yasmina, he removes his son and threatened to kill him.

Cast 

 Josiane Balasko as Inspector Mireille Molyneux
 Isaach de Bankolé as Inspector Blaise Lacroix 
 Jean-Pierre Léaud as Commissioner Bullfinch
 Ticky Holgado as Inspector Blondel
 Florent Pagny as Jean-Pierre
 Catherine Hiegel as Dany
 Dora Doll as Madame Lou
 Marie France as The coach
 Jean-Marie Marion as Charlie
 Patrick Pérez as Jeannot
 Patrick Olivier as Inspector Averell
 Jacques Delaporte as Inspector MacDo
 Max Vialle as The Captain
 Fred Romano as Lisa
 Rocky as Begude
 Jean-François Perrier as I.G.S. Captain
 Farida Khelfa as Yasmine
 Marie Pillet as Nadia
 Ludovic Paris as Camboulis
 Lilia as Manu
 Alex Descas
 Bruno Moynot
 Roschdy Zem

Production
In 1988, the movie was screened to the Toronto International Film Festival.

Accolades

References

External links

1987 films
1987 comedy films
French comedy films
1980s French-language films
Films directed by Josiane Balasko
1980s French films